Badman or Bad Man may refer to:

Arts and entertainment

Fictional characters
 A villain, an evil fictional character
 Badman, a CollegeHumor parody of Batman
 Mr Badman, in The Life and Death of Mr Badman, by John Bunyan, 1680
 Badman, in the video game What Did I Do to Deserve This, My Lord?

Music
 Badman (EP), by B.A.P, 2013, and its title track
 "Bad Man" (song), by R. Kelly, 2000
 "Badman", a song by Roll Deep from the album Rules and Regulations, 2007
 "Bad Man", a song by Coheed and Cambria from the album Vaxis – Act II: A Window of the Waking Mind, 2022
 "Bad Man", a song by Pitbull from the album Climate Change, 2017
 "Bad Man (Smooth Criminal), by Polo G, 2021

Other uses in arts and entertainment
 Diary of a Bad Man, a web TV series 
 Badman (web series)
 Bad Man (film), a 2015 South Korean film

People
 George Whiting Badman (1886–1953), South Australian business man, and horse breeder and owner
 Oliver Badman (1885–1977), Australian politician
 Robert Badman (fl. 1908), British Olympic fencer

Other uses
 Badman (slang), a Jamaican slang term for anti-social youth
 Badman, a gunfighter
 Badman Recording Co., an American record label
 Badman Review, into English home education, 2009

See also

 The Bad Man (disambiguation)
 Villain (disambiguation)